"Mind on You" is a song by Australian recording artist Guy Sebastian. It was released on 10 March 2017 as the third and final single from Sebastian's extended play Part 1 (2016). Sebastian told Nova 96.9, "This song, I guess it's just a kind of soulful song about last night. You know when you meet somebody and you have a great time or you’re just with somebody you know and you're just having an amazing night and then it just lingers. That's that feeling - you just can’t get it out of your mind and it’s the next day and you're still reminiscing about that time. It's a feel good song."

Promotion
Sebastian performed the song live on Today on 17 March 2017, and in the Nova Red Room on 22 March 2017.

Music video
The music video for "Mind on You" was released on 7 March 2017. The video takes place in a disco bowling alley with the real Sebastian spinning tunes in the DJ booth as several of his alter-egos go head to head in a bowling competition. Sebastian said: "I had an absolute blast making this vid and playing all the different characters. I think I enjoyed playing Monica the most."

auspOp reviewed the video, saying "It's exceedingly tongue in cheek, all in good fun. And we appreciate the fact that he’s not taking himself too seriously this time around."

Reception
Michael Smith, in a review of the EP called "Mind on You" a "tropical pop banger".

Track listing
CD single
"Mind on You" – 3:32

Release history

References

2016 songs
2017 singles
Guy Sebastian songs
Sony Music Australia singles
Songs written by Guy Sebastian
Songs written by Louis Schoorl
Songs written by Trey Campbell